Zastruże may refer to the following places in Poland:
Zastruże, Lower Silesian Voivodeship (south-west Poland)
Zastruże, Masovian Voivodeship (east-central Poland)
Zastruże, Greater Poland Voivodeship (west-central Poland)